Varanus salvadorii, also known as the crocodile monitor, Papuan monitor and Salvadori's monitor, is a species of monitor lizard endemic to New Guinea. The tail of the species is exceptionally long, so some specimens have been claimed to exceed the length of the world's largest lizard, the Komodo dragon; however, V. salvadorii is far less massive.

Varanus salvadorii is an arboreal lizard with a dark green body marked with bands of yellowish spots. It has a characteristic blunt snout and a very long tail. It lives in mangrove swamps and coastal rainforests in the southeastern part of the island, feeding on birds, small mammals, eggs, and carrion. Its teeth are better adapted than those of most monitors for seizing fast-moving prey. Like all monitors, V. salvadorii has anatomical features that enable it to breathe more easily when running than other lizards can, but it may have even greater stamina than most other monitor species. Little is known of its reproduction and development, as the species is difficult to breed in captivity.

V. salvadorii is threatened by deforestation and poaching, and is protected by the CITES agreement. The lizard is hunted and skinned alive by tribesmen to make drums, who describe the monitor as an evil spirit that "climbs trees, walks upright, breathes fire, and kills men", yet the tribesmen maintain that the monitor gives warnings if crocodiles are nearby.

Taxonomy
It was subordinated to the genus Varanus under the name Varanus salvadorii by George Albert Boulenger in 1885.

Etymology 
The generic name, Varanus, is derived from the Arabic waral, meaning "lizard". The term "monitor" is thought to have come about from confusion between waral and the German , meaning "warning". The term "goanna" came about as a corruption of the name "iguana". The specific name, salvadorii, is derived from a Latinization of Tommaso Salvadori, an Italian ornithologist who worked in New Guinea.

Evolution
The evolutionary history of V. salvadorii started with the genus Varanus, which originated in Asia about 40 million years ago (Mya). Around 15 Mya, a tectonic connection between Australia and Southeast Asia allowed the varanids to spread into what is now the Indonesian archipelago.

Based upon DNA sequences of three nuclear and two mitochondrial genes, cladistic analysis identifies V. salvadorii as a member of a species cluster that includes the lace monitor (V. varius) and the Komodo dragon (Varanus komodoensis). Morphological considerations suggest that Varanus priscus was also a member of the group. Monitors apparently colonized Australasia from Asia about 32 Mya; the varius clade then arose about 17 Mya.

Distribution
The largest of the seven species of monitors found on the island of New Guinea, V. salvadorii occurs in both the state Papua New Guinea and the Indonesian region of West Papua. It inhabits the high and low canopies of the lowland rainforests and coastal mangrove swamps, sometimes venturing out of these areas during floods in the rainy seasons. No detailed field investigation data are available for V. salvadorii, so the full extent of its range is unknown.  Its remote and generally inaccessible habitat is an obstacle to detailed study of this monitor in its natural habitat.

Biology and morphology

The most characteristic feature of V. salvadorii is its blunt, bulbous snout, which makes it look different from every other monitor on New Guinea, and suggested the common name "tree crocodile".  The body of the lizard is dark green with rings of yellow spots. The tail is banded yellow and black and is extremely long, more than twice as long as the snout-to-vent length.

Its teeth are long, straight, and sharp. Its claws are prominent and strongly curved. No clear external sexual dimorphism is seen.

Various descriptions are mutually inconsistent, but  agreement exists that V. salvadorii is unique among extant varanid species, in that the animal's tail is much longer than the snout-to-vent length in both juveniles and adults. One figure gives the tail as two-thirds longer, whereas another states that the tail is 210% of the animal's body length.

Reports of the maximal length vary greatly and are the subject of much dispute. It possibly attains the greatest length among extant species of lizards, although it is considerably less massive than the Komodo dragon. Specimens are known to reach at least  in length. but it has been claimed to grow much longer. A specimen measuring  reportedly was caught in Konedobu by Dr. F. Barker. Claims that some specimens considerably exceed such lengths are so far unsupported.

Claims of V. salvadorii attaining large weights also are unverified; the species is much more slender than Komodo dragons of comparable length.

Varanus salvadorii has mammal-like aerobic abilities; a positive pressure gular pump in the animal's throat assists lung ventilation.  Unlike most lizards that cannot breathe efficiently while running, because of Carrier's constraint, the gular pump of monitor lizards enables them to overcome the effect of one lung at a time being compressed by their running gait. The evolutionary development of the gular pump is functionally analogous to that of the diaphragm in mammals, which ventilates the lung independently of locomotion. V. salvadorii may be the species that achieves the greatest running endurance as a result of its gular pump. Investigation supports the idea that gular breathing is an evolutionary development that masks the effect of Carrier's constraint.

Behavior

V. salvadorii is a highly arboreal lizard. It can hang onto branches with its rear legs, and occasionally use its tail as a prehensile grip. The primary function of the tail, however, is as a counterbalance when leaping from branch to branch. As in some other Varanus species, the tail also may be used for defense, as captive specimens may attempt to lash keepers with their tails. This species occasionally is seen in the pet trade, but has a reputation for aggression and unpredictability. Although they are known to rest and bask in trees, they sleep on the ground or submerged in water.

These monitors  rise up on their hind legs to check their surroundings, behavior that also has been documented in Gould's monitors (V. gouldii). They are known to exhibit a warning posture, in which they carry their tails rolled up behind them. According to native belief, they give a warning call if they see crocodiles. In general V. salvadorii avoids human contact, but its bite is capable of causing infection, like the Komodo dragon's. One fatality was reported from a bite in 1983 when a Papuan woman was bitten and later died from an infection.

Diet
The teeth of V. salvadorii do not resemble those of other monitor species, which typically are blunt, peglike, and face slightly rearward. Their upper teeth are long, fang-like, set vertically in the jawbone, adapted to hooking into fast-moving prey such as birds, bats, and rodents. Their lower teeth are housed in a fleshy sheath. In the wild, V. salvadorii is the top predator in New Guinea, feeding on birds (particularly Cacatua sp. and maleos (Macrocephalon maleo)), eggs, small mammals (such as rats and bandicoots), frogs, reptiles, and carrion. Natives have reported that it can take down pigs, deer, and hunting dogs, and hauls its prey into the canopy to consume it. Captive specimens have been known to eat fish, frogs, rodents, chickens, and dog food.

This species has been observed hunting prey in a unique fashion for monitor lizards.  Rather than following its prey to ambush it from behind, V. salvadorii may stalk its prey and anticipate where it will run, meeting it headlong.

Reproduction
Reproduction of V. salvadorii has only been observed in captivity, so nothing is known about its reproduction in the wild. The egg clutches, comprising four to 12 eggs, are deposited around October to January, with the eggs showing a remarkable difference in dimensions, a phenomenon for which no explanation is known. Most clutches laid in captivity have been infertile, and only four successful breedings have been documented thus far. Like those of many other monitors, the hatchlings of V. salvadorii are more colorful than adults, and feed primarily on insects and small reptiles.

Conservation
Varanus salvadorii is currently protected under the CITES Appendix II, which requires an exportation permit for international trade. It is not listed on the IUCN Red List or the Endangered Species Act. It faces threats from deforestation and poaching, as it is hunted and skinned alive by native peoples, who consider the monitor an evil spirit that "climbs trees, walks upright, breathes fire, and kills men", to make drums .  In 2008,  52 individuals were maintained at 17 zoological parks in the United States, with an unknown number in private collections.

References

 Honoluluzoo.org

Varanus
Reptiles of Indonesia
Monitor lizards of New Guinea
Reptiles described in 1878
Taxa named by Wilhelm Peters
Taxa named by Giacomo Doria
Endemic fauna of New Guinea
Apex predators